was a Japanese politician. He was a member of the House of Councillors from 1989 to 2001.

Ishiwata died of heart failure at the age of 73.

References

2014 deaths
Japanese politicians
Year of birth missing